Ruedi Uster (born 4 September 1941) is a Swiss speed skater. He competed at the 1964 Winter Olympics and the 1968 Winter Olympics.

References

1941 births
Living people
Swiss male speed skaters
Olympic speed skaters of Switzerland
Speed skaters at the 1964 Winter Olympics
Speed skaters at the 1968 Winter Olympics
People from Gorzów County